Hidden Valley Discovery Park is a family-run visitor attraction near the town of Launceston, Cornwall, England, UK. Founded in 1994 by Pete Jones, as a simple treasure hunt and play area, the park has expanded to include a "Forbidden Mansion" with mazes and team treasure hunts. It also includes a  gauge miniature railway system around the site, encouraging 11,000 visitors each year.

History 
The park was founded in 1994 as Tredidon Trails, originally just including a treasure hunt and children's play area. The founder was Pete Jones, an engineering graduate who took much inspiration from the famous British engineer Isambard Kingdom Brunel. 

The park currently receives about 11,000 visitors each year and includes several treasure hunt trails, a miniature railway and mazes. The reception area which resembles a pumping station from the Victorian era includes a restaurant and gift shop. The Forbidden Mansion in the grounds includes Victorian fixtures and fittings, but has been designed to include secret passageways and upside down rooms. Inside the mansion there are several treasure hunts for teams to work through to gain a crystal in the style of Crystal Maze.

The park's  gauge miniature railway is named Porterswick Junction Light Railway. It was constructed in 2002 and was extended in 2003 to form a complete 900 yard loop. The line now includes two bridges which go over the top, as well as an engine shed, inspection pit and two locomotives which operate at the site.

See also 

 Ridable miniature railway

References 

Amusement parks in England
Entertainment in Cornwall
Tourist attractions in Cornwall
Miniature railways in the United Kingdom
1994 establishments in England
Amusement parks opened in 1994